Wicked City is an American procedural drama television series created by Steven Baigelman for the broadcast network ABC. The series aired from October 27, 2015 to December 15, 2015. and focused on two LAPD detectives (Jeremy Sisto and Gabriel Luna) as they search for a pair of romantically-linked serial killers (Ed Westwick and Erika Christensen) terrorizing the Sunset Strip. The main cast also includes Taissa Farmiga, Karolina Wydra, Evan Ross, Anne Winters, and Jaime Ray Newman.

On November 13, 2015, after airing only three episodes, ABC announced Wicked City had been cancelled, pulling the series from its fall schedule and stopping production following the completion of the eighth episode. The remaining episodes were made available by Hulu on December 22, 2015, with the finale being released on December 30, 2015.

Plot
In 1982 Los Angeles, police detectives Jack Roth (Jeremy Sisto) and Paco Contreras (Gabriel Luna) are partnered up to investigate a series of murders on the Sunset Strip. The detectives enlist the help of journalist Karen McClaren (Taissa Farmiga), photographer Diver Hawkes (Evan Ross), and Jack's mistress and undercover cop Dianne Kubek (Karolina Wydra) in order to identify and capture the Hollywood Slayer (Ed Westwick) and his lover (Erika Christensen).

Cast and characters

Main
 Jeremy Sisto as Jack Roth
 Taissa Farmiga as Karen McClaren
 Gabriel Luna as Paco Contreras
 Jaime Ray Newman as Allison Roth
 Evan Ross as Diver Hawkes
 Ed Westwick as Kent Grainger
 Anne Winters as Vicki Roth
 Karolina Wydra as Dianne Kubek
 Erika Christensen as Betty Beaumontaine

Recurring
 Talia Toms as Jane
 Kirk Baltz as Artie Bukowski
 Sara Mornell as Eileen Miller
 Olivia Moss as Mary
 W. Earl Brown as Captain Dan Wilkinson
 Lew Temple as Dave Keller
 Kascee Murdock as Freddie Beaumontaine
 Lola Wayne Villa as Tiffany Beaumontaine
 Vincent Ventresca as Jimmy Lovett
 Doug Simpson as Ralph Peyton
 Heather Grace Hancock as Mallory Kharchenko
 Tyson Ritter as Bucket

Guest stars
 Stephen Pearcy as Roscoe
 Joe Walsh as Director
 Haley Strode as Rita Forrester
 Gabriel Bateman as Cooper Flynn
 Eric Pierpoint as Bruce Forrester
 Sam Adegoke as Graham Walker
 Heather Mazur as Penelope Evans

Episodes

Production

Development

It was first reported in September 2014 that the American Broadcasting Company network was developing a true crime series created by Steven Baigelman, and executive produced by Baigelman with Laurie Zaks, Todd Lieberman, and David Hoberman of Mandeville Films. Originally conceived as an anthology series, the project was described as "a character-driven, true crime procedural that explores sex, politics and popular culture across various noteworthy eras in L.A. history." On January 23, 2015, it was announced that ABC had given the project a pilot order. The original pilot, then titled L.A. Crime, was directed by Tom Shankland.

On May 7, 2015, the pilot was officially ordered to series by ABC, and its title was changed to Wicked City. At the network's Upfront, ABC president Paul Lee stated that the show was their highest testing pilot of 2015 among millennials. The series was originally intended to be a midseason entry for the 2015–16 television season, but was moved up to an October premiere when Of Kings and Prophets was pulled from ABC's fall schedule. On June 11, 2015, Amy B. Harris was announced as showrunner and executive producer for the series. On June 18, 2015, the first season was reported to consist of 10 one-hour episodes. On June 29, 2015, Jon Cassar joined Wicked City as a director and executive producer.

Casting
On February 24, 2015, Erika Christensen was the first to be cast in the role of Betty Beaumontaine. Taissa Farmiga and Darrell Britt-Gibson were cast the following day as Karen McClaren and Diver Hawkes, respectively. On March 3, 2015, Karolina Wydra joined the cast as Dianne Kubek. The next day, it was announced that Adam Rothenberg had been cast in the leading role of Detective Jack Roth, and Holley Fain had been cast as his wife Allison. On March 11, 2015, Anne Winters joined the cast as Vicki Roth. That same day, it was announced that Gabriel Luna had been cast in the role of Detective Paco Contreras. On March 12, 2015, Ed Westwick was cast as Kent Grainger, the Hollywood Slayer. On May 18, 2015, it was announced that the roles of Jack Roth, Diver Hawkes, and Allison Roth were being recast. Rothenberg departed the project due to the renewal of his television series Ripper Street. On July 6, 2015, it was reported that Jeremy Sisto and Evan Ross had landed the roles of Jack Roth and Diver Hawkes, respectively, in the recasting. On August 13, 2015, Jaime Ray Newman was confirmed to star as Allison Roth.

In August 2015, the producers stated that the series plans to have notable musicians appearing in guest roles. Among them were Stephen Pearcy of Ratt, Joe Walsh of the Eagles, and Tyson Ritter of The All-American Rejects. In September 2015, Vincent Ventresca joined the cast to recur as Jimmy Lovett, the ex-boyfriend of Betty. Gabriel Bateman and Haley Strode were cast to portray Kent as a child (then named Cooper Flynn) and his mother, Rita Forrester, in flashbacks.

Filming
Principal photography for the pilot episode began on March 16, 2015, in Los Angeles, California. Filming took place at the Los Angeles Herald-Examiner building located in Downtown Los Angeles, on Ventura Boulevard in the San Fernando Valley, and at the Whisky a Go Go on the Sunset Strip. Production on the pilot was completed on April 2, 2015. Filming for the remainder of the series was shot on sound stages and on location on the Sunset Strip; visual effects were later added to give the series a realistic '80s look. Principal photography for the season began on August 20, 2015. The series' sound stages are located at the Los Angeles Center Studios. Production on the series ended on November 17, 2015.

On November 13, 2015, ABC cancelled the series, announcing their decision to stop production following the completion of filming for the series' eighth episode.

Marketing
The first promotional trailer, episode stills, and character portraits were revealed on May 12, 2015, at the ABC Upfront. Two promotional posters for the first season were released exclusively by Variety on August 25, 2015. On October 20, 2015 the network released footage of several minutes of the pilot to television news sites.

Reception

Reviews
Wicked City has received generally negative critical reception from television critics. On review aggregator website Rotten Tomatoes, the series holds an 18% rating, based on 45 reviews, with an average rating of 4.07/10. The site's critical consensus reads, "Wicked City falls prey to the style-over-substance stereotype of the decade in which it takes place – although it does have a killer '80s soundtrack." On Metacritic, the series holds a 33 out of 100 rating, from 30 critical responses, indicating "generally unfavorable reviews".

Awards and nominations

Ratings

The first episode premiered to a 0.9/3 18–49 rating and 3.28 million viewers, marking a then-record low for a non-Friday premiere on ABC. The second episode saw the ratings drop to a 0.7/2 18–49 rating and 2.42 million viewers. By the third episode, ratings dropped even lower to a 0.4/1 18–49 rating and 1.69 million viewers, prompting ABC to pull the series off its schedule.

Broadcast
The series began airing on TVN 7 in Poland and Fox Crime in Asia on October 29, 2015. All five unaired episodes were made available weekly to New Zealand viewers on TVNZ OnDemand, from November 18 through December 30, 2015. The remaining episodes, excluding the series finale, were released on Hulu in the United States on December 22, 2015, with the finale airing on December 30. It airs on Fox with Finnish Subtitles.

References

External links
 
 
 

2010s American crime drama television series
2010s American police procedural television series
2015 American television series debuts
2015 American television series endings
American action television series
American Broadcasting Company original programming
English-language television shows
Fiction about necrophilia
Television series by ABC Studios
Television shows set in Los Angeles
Television series set in 1982
Erotic television series
Erotic thrillers
Erotic drama television series